Aadat Se Majboor is an Indian comedy television series. The show aired from 3 October 2017 to 26 February 2018 on SAB TV.

Plot
When five young people with completely different personalities work together in one space it is bound to create some competition as well as some comic situations. Such is the life of these five frenemies -Sunny, J.D, Ranjan, Riya and Sam who work together in a magazine publishing company filled with co-workers of individual personalities as well.

Cast

Main
 Sana Makbul as Riya Tootejaa
 Vanshika Sharma as Samiksha, a.k.a. Sam
 Anuj Pandit Sharma as Sunny
 Rishab Chadha as Jamnadas Dhirubhai Majithia, a.k.a. JD
 Haresh K Raut as Ranjan
 Anant Mahadevan as Roshan Lal Tootejaa/Darshan Lal Tootejaa

Recurring
 Shekhar Shukla as Mr. Patel
 Pragati Mehra as Menka
 Pratik Parihar as Rupesh Patel
 Melissa Pais as Inspector Rohini Talpade
 Manmeet Grewal as Manmeet Singh
 Surleen Kaur as Surleen
 Ajay Jadhav as the constable in the police station

Guest Cast
 Krishna Abhishek as Bunty Sharma
 Mithun Chakraborty as Himself
 Kapil Sharma as Himself
 Bharti Singh as Herself

References

External links
 
 Aadat Se Majboor on SonyLIV

Sony SAB original programming
Hindi-language television shows
Indian comedy television series
2017 Indian television series debuts
2018 Indian television series endings
Television shows set in Mumbai
Workplace comedy television series